Marion is a city in Guadalupe County, Texas, United States. The town was incorporated by 1941. The population was 1,034 at the 2020 census. It is part of the San Antonio Metropolitan Statistical Area.

History
The town is named after  Marion Dove, whose grandfather, Joshua W. Young, owned a plantation that the Galveston, Harrisburg and San Antonio Railway passed through in 1877.

Geography
Farm to Market Road 78 passes through the center of town, leading west  to San Antonio and east  to Seguin, the Guadalupe County seat.

Marion is a small town that has a 3A school(the Marion Bulldogs) and a few businesses, including a hardware store, meat market, gas stations and several restaurants.

Demographics

As of the 2020 United States census, there were 1,034 people, 386 households, and 255 families residing in the city.

As of the census of 2000, there were 1,099 people in the city. The population density was 1,544.0 people per square mile (597.6/km). There were 393 housing units at an average density of 561.4/sq mi (218.3/km). The racial makeup of the city was 74.25% White, 6.01% African American, 1.09% Native American, 1.09% Asian, 16.01% from other races, and 1.55% from two or more races. Hispanic or Latino of any race were 37.22% of the population.

There were 393 households, out of which 43.7% had children under the age of 18 living with them, 59.6% were married couples living together, 18.1% had a female householder with no husband present, and 19.4% were non-families. 17.5% of all households were made up of individuals, and 6.7% had someone living alone who was 65 years of age or older. The average household size was 2.95 and the average family size was 3.32 which can be directly compared to the US's average household size of 2.59 and average family size of 3.14.

In the city, the population was spread out, with 30.9% under the age of 18, 7.8% from 18 to 24, 29.8% from 25 to 44, 20.4% from 45 to 64, and 11.1% who were 65 years of age or older. The median age was 34 years. For every 100 females, there were 96.3 males. For every 100 females age 18 and over, there were 84.7 males.

The median income for a household in the city was $36,635, and the median income for a family was $40,625. Males had a median income of $27,125 versus $21,771 for females. The per capita income for the city was $13,302. About 7.0% of families and 8.4% of the population were below the poverty line, including 9.7% of those under age 18 and 13.8% of those age 65 or over.

Education
The city is served by the Marion Independent School District. A small portion is served by the Schertz-Cibolo-Universal City Independent School District.

References

External links
City of Marion official website

Cities in Texas
Cities in Guadalupe County, Texas
Greater San Antonio